Xaa-His dipeptidase (aminoacylhistidine dipeptidase, carnosinase, homocarnosinase, dipeptidase M) is an enzyme. This enzyme catalyses the following chemical reaction

 Hydrolysis of Xaa-His dipeptides

This mammalian cytosolic enzyme also acts on anserine and homocarnosine.

References

External links 
 

EC 3.4.13